Fairford is a former provincial electoral division in Manitoba, Canada.  It was created for the 1920 provincial election, and eliminated with the 1958 election.

Stuart Garson, who served as Premier of Manitoba from 1943 to 1948, represented this constituency for a number of years.

Provincial representatives

Former provincial electoral districts of Manitoba